Agonda is a large village located in Canacona in South Goa district, India. Agonda is famous for its beach and It is one of the only four beaches designated as turtle nesting sites under the Coastal Regulation Zone 2011 notification.

Demographics
As of the 2011 India census, Agonda had a population of 3801. Males constituted 47% of the population and females 53%.Average Sex Ratio of Agonda village is 1110 which is higher than Goa state average of 973. Agonda had an average literacy rate of 86.11%, higher than the national average of 74.04%: male literacy was 91.47% and female literacy 81.26%. 10.42% of the population was under 6 years of age.

Agonda beach 

There is one more beach on the north side of Agonda cliff called Cola beach which has an adjoining lagoon.

During the month of September, the beach serves as a nesting ground for olive ridley sea turtles.

In 2016 it was ranked on TripAdvisor's "Travelers Choice" as fourth in Asia by Tripadvisor 2016 and first in India.

References

External links 

 

Villages in South Goa district
Beaches of South Goa district
Beaches of Goa